The 1970–71 USC Trojans men's basketball team represented University of Southern California during the 1970–71 college basketball season. The Trojans led by 4th year coach Bob Boyd.

Roster

Schedule

References 

USC Trojans men's basketball seasons
USC
USC Trojans
USC Trojans